Dale Wood (born 9 June 1983) is an Australian racing driver who currently co-drives for Brad Jones Racing's No. 8 Holden ZB Commodore in the Pirtek Enduro Cup. He currently resides in Melbourne, Victoria. He commenced his full-time V8 Supercar career in 2009 with the newly formed team Kelly Racing team, having raced previously for the Tasman Motorsport aligned Greg Murphy Racing Fujitsu series squad. Wood was replaced after the Hidden Valley round although he returned to the team for the endurance race season, pairing up with Jack Perkins. He returned to the team a year later, again in an endurance race role.

Career

Greg Murphy Racing
Wood competed in the Fujitsu Development Series for Greg Murphy Racing in 2007 and 2008.

Kelly Racing
Wood was confirmed as the driver of the No. 16 Kelly Racing entry for 2009, with sponsorship from Hi-Tec Oils and Red Rooster. This car will use one of the licences owned by Kelly Racing teammate, Jack Perkins' father, Larry Perkins. Wood's No. 16 car for 2009 is the car previously run by Jack Perkins at Perkins Engineering in 2008, chassis number PE046. Oscar Fiorinotto has been named as Dale's engineer for the 2009 season.

Wood's first track appearance in his Kelly Racing Commodore was at the V8 Supercars Official Category Test Day, at Winton Raceway on 9 March 2009, where he was joined by the other three Kelly Racing entries, and all other Victorian-based V8 Supercar teams. At the test day, with the sponsorship of the car still to be confirmed, it ran in an interim testing livery, thanking the team for getting all four cars ready for the season in two months.

Tony D'Alberto Racing
In mid-2011, it was announced that Wood would compete alongside Tony D'Alberto for Phillip Island and Bathurst in their Ford Performance Racing built Falcon. Wood was also given some extra race miles at the Townsville Fujitsu Series round in a VE Commodore, as their regular Fujitsu driver, David Wall was suffering from a broken leg.

Britek Motorsport 

Wood was contracted to drive the No. 21 Britek Motorsport Holden VF Commodore in the 2014 V8 Supercars Championship. After achieving his first Championship podium finish at Winton earlier in the year, Wood placed third in Qualifying for the 2014 Supercheap Auto Bathurst 1000. He Remained with the team in 2015 V8 Supercars Championship.

Nissan Motorsport
For 2016, Wood returned to Nissan Motorsport, Having previously driven for the team in 2009 while running Holden VE Commodores. He was signed to drive the No. 96 GB Galvanising Racing Altima.

Erebus Motorsport
Wood joined Erebus Motorsport and drove the No. 99 Holden VF Commodore in the 2017 Supercars Championship.

Tim Blanchard Racing
Wood will be co-driving with Tim Blanchard in the No. 21 Holden ZB Commodore at Tim Blanchard Racing, a satellite team of Brad Jones Racing.

Career results

Supercars Championship results

Bathurst 1000 results

References

External links
Dale Wood V8 Supercars Official Profile
Driver Database profile
Racing Reference profile

1983 births
Formula Ford drivers
Living people
Racing drivers from Melbourne
Supercars Championship drivers
V8SuperTourer drivers
Nismo drivers
Kelly Racing drivers
Dick Johnson Racing drivers